Dion Jean Gilbert Graus (born 19 March 1967 in Heerlen) is a Dutch politician and animal rights activist. He has been an MP on behalf of the Party for Freedom (Partij voor de Vrijheid, PVV) since 30 November 2006. He focuses on matters of agriculture, animal rights, small and medium enterprises, public transport, aviation and rail transport.

Graus is a former car salesman and sales representative in veterinary products, and worked for the local Limburg television station TV Limburg.

Controversy

In December 2006, stories in the Dutch media erupted accusing Graus of having a history of unpaid bills, fraud, lawsuits, disgruntled employers and abusive relations with women. The Dutch justice department later reported that three counts filed against Graus were dismissed, without going into details about the other accusations. In addition, the newspaper de Volkskrant on January 27, 2007 found several NRC allegations lacking substance e.g. the bills had been paid after all. The newspaper also reported that Graus had the full confidence of party leader Geert Wilders.

References 
  Parlement.com biography

External links 
  House of Representatives biography

1967 births
Living people
21st-century Dutch politicians
Dutch animal rights activists
Dutch television presenters
Dutch television producers
Members of the House of Representatives (Netherlands)
Party for Freedom politicians
People from Heerlen